Cerithiella cepene is a species of very small sea snail, a marine gastropod mollusc in the family Newtoniellidae. This species is known from European waters. It was described by de Lima and de Barros, in 2007.

References

Newtoniellidae
Gastropods described in 2007